Blumenavia is a genus of fungi in the family Phallaceae. The genus contains three species found in South America and Africa.

Species

References

External links

Phallales
Agaricomycetes genera